Everyone's a Winner may refer to:
 "Everyone's a Winner," a 1977 song by London, from their album Animal Games
 "Every 1's a Winner," a 1978 song and eponymous album by Hot Chocolate
 Everyone's a Winner: Life in Our Congratulatory Culture, a 2011 non-fiction book by Joel Best
 "Everyone's a Winner", a 1991 song from the Shining Time Station episode Field Day
 "Everyone's a Winner," a 2016 song by Jackyl, from their album Rowyco